The 2022 English football summer transfer window runs from 10 June to 1 September 2022. Players without a club may be signed at any time, clubs may sign players on loan dependent on their league's regulations, and clubs may sign a goalkeeper on an emergency loan if they have no registered senior goalkeeper available. This list includes transfers featuring at least one club from either the Premier League or the EFL that were completed after the end of the winter 2021–22 transfer window on 2 February and before the end of the 2022 summer window.

Transfers 

All players and clubs without a flag are English. While Cardiff City, Swansea City and Newport County are affiliated with the Football Association of Wales and thus take the Welsh flag, they play in the Championship and League Two respectively, and so their transfers are included here.

Loans

References
Generic

Specific

England
Summer 2022
2022–23 in English football